Nadre Butcher (born 6 March 2004) is a Barbadian footballer who plays as a midfielder for Pro Shottas United and the Barbados national team.

Club career
As a youth Butcher played for Pro Shottas United and was the youth tournament's joint top goal scorer in 2019.

In August 2022 Butcher and fellow-Bajan Honor Bradshaw joined SpVg Solingen-Wald 03 of the German Bezirksliga. In total he made four league appearances for the club, scoring one goal. His lone tally came against Sportfreunde Baumberg II on 4 September 2022.

International career
At the youth level, Butcher represented Barbados in the 2019 CONCACAF Boys' Under-15 Championship and 2021 CONCACAF U-20 Championship qualifying. In the former competition he scored his team's only two goals, one against Trinidad and Tobago and a second against Costa Rica. In preparation for the tournament he scored in a 6–0 friendly victory over Sint Maarten and a brace in a 3–0 victory over Puerto Rico. 

In January 2022 Butcher was called up to the senior squad for a series of friendlies ahead of the 2022–23 CONCACAF Nations League B. He went on to make his senior international debut on 28 January 2022 in a 0–1 friendly defeat away to Suriname.

International goals
Scores and results list Barbados's goal tally first.

International career statistics

References

External links
 
 
 Barbados FA profile
 

Living people
2004 births
Barbadian footballers
Barbados under-20 international footballers
Barbados youth international footballers
Association football midfielders